Tyari is an Assyrian tribe and a historical district within Hakkari, Turkey. The area was traditionally divided into Upper (Tyari Letha) and Lower Tyari (Tyari Khtetha)–each consisting of several Assyrian villages. Both Upper and Lower Tyari are located on the western bank of the Zab river. Today, the district mostly sits in around the town of Çukurca. Historically, the largest village of the region was known as Ashitha. According to Hannibal Travis the Tyari Assyrians were known for their skills in weaving and knitting.

Before 1915, Tyari was home to Assyrians from the Tyari tribe as well as a minority of Kurds. Following the Assyrian genocide, Ṭyārāyē, along with other Assyrians residing in the Hakkari highlands, were forced to leave their villages in southeast Anatolia and fled to join their fellow Assyrian brethren in modern-day northern Iraq (Sarsink, Sharafiya, Chammike and various villages in the Nahla valley), northeastern Syria (Tel Tamer and Al Hasakah), Armenia, Georgia and, from the late 20th century, to western countries. The  Tyari tribe was, according to Robert Elliot Speer, one of the Assyrian "ashirets". In 1869 there were 15,000 Tyari Assyrians living in 2,500 houses in the Tyari district according to John George Taylor in a report to the Earl of Clarendon. The Tyari Assyrians lived across 51 different villages and constituted 50,000 members - making it the most powerful among the semi-independent Assyrian tribes. The Tyari district is located in the boundaries of the ancient kingdom of Adiabene.

Etymology
Tyari may be a variation of the ancient "Autiyara". American historian Albert T. Olmstead describes in his work History of the Persian Empire how the Persian General Vaumisa wins a battle in the Autiyara districts located in Tyari and mentions that this is where Assyrian Christians maintained independence until modern times.

Indeed, the Assyrians of Tyari were renowned even amongst neighboring Kurds and Armenians for their yogurt, cheese and other dairy products mostly made from sheep or goat's milk. They were also famous for their textiles, which again were spun and woven from sheep's wool. They also made woolen felt for their characteristic conical caps.

Military engagements 
One of the reasons the Assyrians of Tyari were able to stay independent for so long despite being significantly outnumbered by Muslims was their fighting ability. The Assyrians of Tyari were especially known for being a fierce, warlike people. It was said that they were the best fighters in the West Asia, along with the Assyrian tribe of Tkhuma. Their Muslim neighbors stated that in order to stand a chance they needed to outnumber the Assyrians of Tyari or Tkhuma five to one, and have superior modern weapons. Assyrians of Tyari used much older weaponry and manufactured their own weapons and ammunition.

In 1834 the leader of the Soran Emirate Muhammad Pasha of Rawanduz tried to subdue the Assyrians of Lower Tyari, but suffered a humiliating defeat at the hands of the outnumbered Assyrians. They then chased the Kurds back to Amadiya. This defeat played a major role in the collapse of the Soran Emirate.

In 1880, Ubeydullah's militia, with the support of mercenaries from the Tyari tribe, invaded the northwestern Kurdish territories of Qajar dynasty in attempt to expand his control.

In 1907 the Ottomans sent troops to Hakkari to stop fighting between the Assyrians of Tyari and Kurds. The Ottoman troops were successful in subduing the Kurds. The Assyrians of Tyari, however, defeated them and the Ottomans were routed and had their weapons seized.

In the early 1930s, the Assyrians consisting mainly of Tyarayeh and Tkhoumnayeh successfully defeated the Iraqis in Dairabun killing 33 and wounding 40, including three officers, while the Assyrians suffered significantly less losses. The Iraqis were armed with modern weapons and attack planes given to them by the British, while the Assyrians were only equipped with old rifles.

In the 1930s, the Iraqis admitted that one Assyrian soldier was equal to three Arab soldiers and saw the Assyrians as a huge threat to Iraq militarily if Assyrians went against the British.

Dialect
The dialect of Tyari belongs to the Ashiret group, along with the dialects of e.g. Tkhuma and Baz, of the Northeastern Neo-Aramaic (NENA) dialects. Like Jīlū, the Tyari dialect is a very distinct Assyrian Neo-Aramaic dialect. Unlike the Jilu, Baz and Gawar dialects (which are very similar to each other), this one is more "thick". It is, in a way, a sort of a "working class" accent of the Assyrian dialects. Dialects within Tyari, and especially the Western group, have more in common with Chaldean Neo-Aramaic than with Iraqi Koine (similar to General Urmian). The Tyari dialect is divided into two main sub-dialects; upper Tyari and lower Tyari.

Many Tyari speakers can switch back and forth from Tyari to "Assyrian Standard" (or "Iraqi Koine") when conversing with Assyrian speakers of other dialects. Some speakers tend to adopt a form of verb conjugation that is closer to the Iraqi Koine or Urmian Standard. This is attributed to the growing exposure to Assyrian Standard-based literature, media, and its use as a liturgical language by the Assyrian Church of the East. Furthermore, it is customary for Assyrian artists to generally sing in Iraqi Koine for them to be intelligible and have widespread recognition. Songs in Tyari dialects are usually of the folk-dance music genre and would attract certain audiences.

Suffixes
Although possessive affixes (beti - "my house") are more convenient and common among Assyrian speakers, those with Tyari and Barwari dialects take a more analytic approach regarding possession, just like modern Hebrew and English.

Villages and sub-clans in Tyari

Division of sub-clans and settlements according to the Diocese of Mar Shimun 

Lower Tyari:

 Garamoon
 Halamoon
 Tcalluk
 Arosh
 Hor
 Teire Rezen
 Asheetha (Ashita)
 Zaweetha
 Minyanish
 Merghe
 Kurkhe
 Leezan (Lizan)
 Oomra Tahtiya
 Zerni
 Karukhta
 Chamba d'Beth Soseena
 Matha d'Kasra
 Be-Zeezo
 Lagippa
 Be-Alahta
 Be-Rawole (Rawel, Ravula)
 Shoord
 Rawloa d'Salabeken

Walto:

 Chamba Hadtha
 Zorawa
 Seerta
 Shwawootha
 Matha d'Mart Miriam
 Khadiana
 Reshe d'Nahra

Upper Tyari:

 Serspeedho
 Siyadhor
 Chamba d' Be Ellia
 Chamba d'Nene
 Chamba d'Coordhaye
 Mezzraa
 Mrateetha
 Be-Nahra
 Be-Zrako
 Roomta
 Jeiatha
 Reshe d'Nahra
 Aina d'Aleete
 Doora Allaya
 Kalaytha
 Mezraa d'Kalaytha
 Chamba d'Melek
 Be-Dalyatha
 Dadosh
 Mabbuaa
 Ko
 Chamba dKoodkhe
 Be-Meriggo
 Roma Smoka
 Chamba d'Hasso
 Darawa
 Malota

Clothing

About the national dress worn by the Tyari men in the Bakuba camp, Brigadier-General Austin wrote; "Fine upstanding fellows they are, ...their legs, encased in long loose baggy trousers of a greyish hue originally, but so patched all over with bits of blue, red, green and other colors that their pants are veritable patch work. A broad cloth, "Kammar band," or waist band, is folded several times round the trunk of the body, and a short cut-away jacket of amazing colors, worn over a thin cotton variegated shirt. The head-dress consists of conical felt cap as depicted in frescoes of Assyrians of thousands of years ago, and which has survived to this day."
"Among them are a number of Tyari men, whose wild looks, combined with the splendour of their dress and arms, are a great interest. […] Their jackets are one mass of gold embroidery (worked by Jews), their shirts, with hanging sleeves, are striped with satin, their trousers, of sailor cut, are silk, made from the cocoons of their own silkworms, woven with broad crimson stripes on a white ground, on which is a zigzag pattern; and their handsome jack-boots are of crimson leather. With they white or red peaked fell hats and twisted silk pagris, their rich girdles, jewelled daggers, and inlaid pistols, they are very imposing."
Isabella L. Bird wrote in her work "Journeys In Persia And Kurdistan" about a Tyari man wearing a white conical cap.

Famous Tyari Assyrians

Bishops and priests
Mar Addai II, Catholicos-Patriarch of the Ancient Church of the East - Ashitha, Lower Tyari
Mar Gewargis III Sliwa, Catholicos-Patriarch of the Assyrian Church of the East - Ashitha, Lower Tyari
Mar Narsai Toma, Metropolitan of Kirkuk of the Ancient Church of the East - Lagippa, Lower Tyari
Mar Toma Giwargis, Metropolitan of Nineveh of the Ancient Church of the East - Matha D'Qasra, Lower Tyari
Mar Daniel Yakob, Bishop of California of the Ancient Church of the East - Ashitha, Lower Tyari
Mar Yacoub Daniel, Metropolitan of Australia and New Zealand of the Ancient Church of the East - Ashitha, Lower Tyari
Mar Emmanuel Elia, former Bishop of North America of the Ancient Church of the East - Ashitha, Lower Tyari
Mar Zaia Khoshaba, Metropolitan of North America of the Ancient Church of the East - Lagippa, Lower Tyari
Mar Aprem Daweed, former Bishop of Dohuk of the Ancient Church of the East - Ashitha, Lower Tyari
Mar Gewargis Younan, Bishop of Chicago of the Ancient Church of the East - Minyanish, Lower Tyari
Mar Odisho Oraham, Bishop of Western Europe of the Assyrian Church of the East - Rumta, Upper Tyari
Mar Aprem Natniel, Bishop of Syria of the Assyrian Church of the East - Sarespido, Upper Tyari

Assyrian Singers
Adwar Mousa
Juliana Jendo
Linda George
Sargon Gabriel

Assyrian tribal leaders
Malik Khoshaba Yosip, (Lower Tyari)
Malik Ismael (Upper Tyari)
 Rais Khiyo Odisho (Chammānāyā)
 Malik Barkho (Bé-Allatha)
 Hurmiz Malik Chikko (Dadoshnāyā)
Malik Yaqo d'Malik Ismael, (Upper Tyari)
Zadoq Nwiya, (Ashitha, Lower Tyari)
Sayfo Keena, (Bnay l'Gippa, Lower Tyari)
Rayis Booko, (Ashitha, Lower Tyari)
Rayis Yawp Sawkho, (Chamba, Upper Tyari)
Rayis Warda Oshana, (Rarwa, Upper Tyari)
Lazar Marqus (Ashitha, Lower Tyari)

See also
 List of Assyrian tribes
 List of Assyrian settlements
 Assyrian independence movement
 Barwari
 Jilu
 Nochiya
 Öveç, Şemdinli
 Beyyurdu, Şemdinli

Notes

References

Assyrian tribes
Hakkari
Hakkâri Province